Watson House may refer to:

in the United States 
(by state then city)
Laura Watson House, Gainesville, Alabama, listed on the National Register of Historic Places (NRHP)
William Henry Watson Homestead, Denmark, Arkansas, listed on the NRHP
Watson House (Hamburg, Arkansas), listed on the NRHP
Watson-Sawyer House, Hamburg, Arkansas, listed on the NRHP
Watson Log Cabin, Tahoe City, California, listed on the NRHP
Watson House (Denver, Colorado), a Denver Landmark
Gov. William T. Watson Mansion, Milford, Delaware, listed on the NRHP
Harman-Watson-Matthews House, Greenville, Georgia, listed on the NRHP
Thomas E. Watson House, Thomson, Georgia, listed on the NRHP
Watson House (Charlestown, Indiana), listed on the NRHP
John Watson House (Hiram, Maine), listed on the NRHP
Abraham Watson House, Cambridge, Massachusetts, listed on the NRHP
William H. and Sabrina Watson House, Lapeer, Michigan, listed on the NRHP
Henry R. Watson House, Saline, Michigan, listed on the NRHP
Dwight and Clara Watson House, Saint Paul, Minnesota, listed on the NRHP
Samuel Stewart Watson House, St. Charles, Missouri, listed on the NRHP
Isaac Watson House, Trenton, New Jersey, listed on the NRHP
 Watson House (Lockport, New York), listed on the NRHP
James Watson House, New York, New York, listed on the NRHP
Watson House, Columbia University, New York City
Elkanah Watson House, Port Kent, New York, listed on the NRHP
H. C. Watson House, Rockingham, North Carolina, listed on the NRHP
John Watson House (Warrenton, North Carolina), listed on the NRHP
T. Max Watson House, Forest City, North Carolina, listed on the NRHP
Watson-Sanders House, Smithfield, North Carolina, listed on the NRHP
McCauley-Watson House, Union Ridge, North Carolina, listed on the NRHP
John Watson House (Warrenton, North Carolina), listed on the NRHP
John N. and Cornelia Watson House, Lakeview, Oregon, listed on the NRHP
Watson-Price Farmstead, Philomath, Oregon, listed on the NRHP
Watson-Curtze Mansion, Erie, Pennsylvania, listed on the NRHP
Clarkson-Watson House, Philadelphia, Pennsylvania, listed on the NRHP
Sally Watson House, Philadelphia, Pennsylvania, listed on the NRHP
Patrick B. Watson House, Park City, Utah, listed on the NRHP
Irinda Watson House, Park City, Utah, listed on the NRHP
Watson House (Chincoteague Island, Virginia)
Old Watson Homestead House, Smithtown, West Virginia, listed on the NRHP

See also
John Watson House (disambiguation)